An aqueduct is a watercourse constructed to carry water from a source to a distribution point far away. In modern engineering, the term aqueduct is used for any system of pipes, ditches, canals, tunnels, and other structures used for this purpose. The term aqueduct also often refers specifically to a bridge carrying an artificial watercourse. Aqueducts were used in ancient Greece, ancient Egypt, and ancient Rome. The simplest aqueducts are small ditches cut into the earth. Much larger channels may be used in modern aqueducts. Aqueducts sometimes run for some or all of their path through tunnels constructed underground. Modern aqueducts may also use pipelines. Historically, agricultural societies have constructed aqueducts to irrigate crops and supply large cities with drinking water.

Etymology

Ancient aqueducts

Although particularly associated with the Romans, aqueducts were devised much earlier in Greece, the Near East, Nile Valley, and Indian subcontinent, where peoples such as the Egyptians and Harappans built sophisticated irrigation systems. Roman-style aqueducts were used as early as the 7th century BC, when the Assyrians built an 80 km long limestone aqueduct, which included a 10 m high section to cross a 300 m wide valley, to carry water to their capital city, Nineveh.

Crete
Although particularly associated with the Romans, aqueducts were likely first used by the Minoans around 2000 BCE. The Minoans had developed what was then an extremely advanced irrigation system, including several aqueducts.

India

The Indian subcontinent is believed to have some of the earliest aqueducts. Evidence can be found at the sites of present-day Hampi, Karnataka. The waterways supplied water to royal bath tubs.

Oman

In Oman from the Iron Age, in Salut, Bat, and other sites, a system of underground aqueducts called falaj or qanāts were constructed, a series of well-like vertical shafts, connected by gently sloping horizontal tunnels.

There are three types of falaj:
Daudi (داوودية) with underground aqueducts
Ghaili (الغيلية ) requiring a dam to collect the water
Aini (العينية ) whose source is a water spring

These enabled large scale agriculture to flourish in a dry land environment.

Persia

In Persia from early times  a system of underground aqueducts called qanāts were constructed, a series of well-like vertical shafts, connected by gently sloping tunnels. This technique:
taps into subterranean water in a manner that delivers water to the surface without need for pumping. The water drains relying on gravity, with the destination lower than the source, which is typically an upland aquifer.
allows water to be transported long distances in hot dry climates without losing a large proportion of the source water to seepage and evaporation.

Petra, Jordan

Throughout Petra, Jordan, the Nabataean engineers took advantage of every natural spring and every winter downpour to channel water where it was needed. They constructed aqueducts and piping systems that allowed water to flow across mountains, through gorges and into the temples, homes, and gardens of Petra's citizens. Walking through the Siq, one can easily spot the remains of channels that directed water to the city center, as well as durable retention dams that kept powerful flood waters at bay.

Greece
On the island of Samos, the Tunnel of Eupalinos was built during the reign of Polycrates (538-522 BC). It is considered an underground aqueduct and brought fresh water to Pythagoreion for roughly a thousand years.

Roman

The aqueducts supplied fresh water to public baths and for drinking water, in large cities across the empire, and set a standard of engineering that was not surpassed for more than a thousand years. Bridges, built in stone with multiple arches, were a distinctive feature of Roman aqueducts and hence the term aqueduct is often applied specifically to a bridge for carrying water.

South America

Near the Peruvian town of Nazca, an ancient pre-Columbian system of aqueducts called Puquios were built and are still in use today. They were made of intricately placed stones, a construction material widely used by the Nazca culture. The time period in which they were constructed is still debated, but some evidence supports circa A.D. 540–552, in response to drought periods in the region.

The Guayabo National Monument of Costa Rica, a park covering the largest archaeological site in the country, contains a system of aqueducts. The complex network of uncovered and covered aqueducts still functions well. The aqueducts are constructed from rounded river stones, which are mostly made of volcanic rock. The civilization that constructed the aqueduct system remains a mystery to archaeologists; it is suspected that Guayabo's aqueducts sat at a point of ancient cultural confluence between Aztecs, Mayans, and Incas.

North America
When Europeans saw the Aztec capital Tenochtitlan, early in the 16th century, the city was watered by two aqueducts. One of these, Chapultepec aqueduct, built circa 1420, was rebuilt by the Spanish almost three hundred years later. Originally tracing part of its path over now-gone Lake Texcoco, only a fragment remains in Mexico City today.

Sri Lanka
Extensive usage of elaborate aqueducts have been found to have been used in ancient Sri Lanka. However, the ancient engineering methods in calculating the exact elevation between the two reservoirs and the exact gradient of the canal to such fine precision had been lost with the fall of the civilization in 13th Century.

Modern aqueducts

Modern aqueducts are a central part of many countries' water distribution infrastructure.

The United States' aqueducts are some of the world's largest. The Catskill Aqueduct carries water to New York City over a distance of 120 miles (190 km), but is dwarfed by aqueducts in the far west of the country, most notably the 242-mile (389-km) Colorado River Aqueduct, which supplies the Los Angeles area with water from the Colorado River nearly 250 miles to the east and the  California Aqueduct, which runs from the Sacramento-San Joaquin River Delta to Lake Perris. The Central Arizona Project is the largest and most expensive aqueduct constructed in the United States. It stretches 336 miles from its source near Parker, Arizona to the metropolitan areas of Phoenix and Tucson.

An aqueduct in New Zealand, "the Oamaru Borough Race", was constructed in the late 19th century to deliver water (and water-power) about 50 km from the Waitaki River at Kurow to the coastal town of Oamaru.

In Spain, the Tagus-Segura Water Transfer system of aqueducts opened in 1979 and transports water  from north to south.

In China, the South–North Water Transfer Project aims to connect the Yangtze River basin to Beijing through three separate systems. The project will reuse part of the Grand Canal of China.

Design

Open channels
The simplest aqueducts are small ditches cut into the earth. A major factor in the design of all open channels is its gradient. A higher gradient allows a smaller channel to carry the same amount of water as a larger channel with a lower gradient, but increases the potential of the water to damage the aqueduct's structure. A typical Roman aqueduct had a gradient of about 1:4800.

Artificial rills

A constructed functional rill is a small canal or aqueduct of stone, brick, concrete, or other lining material, usually rectilinear in cross section, for water transportation from a source such as a river, spring, reservoir, qanat, or aqueduct for domestic consumption or agricultural irrigation of crop land uses.

Rills were traditionally used in Middle Eastern and Mediterranean climate cultures of ancient and historical eras; and other climates and continents worldwide. They are distinguished from a 'water ditch' by being lined to reduce absorption losses and to increase durability. The Falaj irrigation system at the Al Ain Oasis, in present-day Abu Dhabi Emirate, uses rills as part of its qanat water system. Sometimes in the Spanish language they are called Acequias.

Rills are also used for aesthetic purposes in landscape design. Rills are used as narrow channels of water inset into the pavement of a garden, as linear water features, and often tiled and part of a fountain design.

The historical origins are from paradise garden religious images that first translated into ancient Persian Gardens. Rills were later exceptionally developed in the Moorish (Spanish) Gardens of Al-andalus, such as at the Alhambra in Granada; and also in other Islamic gardens, cultures, and countries. Early 20th century examples are in the María Luisa Park gardens in Seville, Spain; and at the Casa del Herrero gardens in Montecito, California.

Tunnels
Aqueducts sometimes run for some or all of their path through tunnels constructed underground. A version of this common in North Africa and Central Asia that has vertical wells at regular intervals is called a qanat. One historic example found in Syria, the Qanat Firaun, extends over 100 kilometers.

Pipes

Modern aqueducts may also make extensive use of pipelines. Pipelines are useful for transporting water over long distances when it needs to move over hills, or where open channels are poor choices due to considerations of evaporation, freezing, pollution, or environmental impact. They can also be used to carry treated water.

Uses
Historically, agricultural societies have constructed aqueducts to irrigate crops. Archimedes invented the water screw to raise water for use in irrigation of croplands.

Another use for aqueducts is to supply large cities with drinking water. It also help drought-prone areas with water supply. Some of the Roman aqueducts still supply water to Rome today. In California, United States, three large aqueducts supply water over hundreds of miles to the Los Angeles area. Two are from the Owens River area, and a third is from the Colorado River.

In modern civil engineering projects, detailed study and analysis of open-channel flow is commonly required to support flood control, irrigation systems, and large water supply systems when an aqueduct rather than a pipeline is the preferred solution.

In the past, aqueducts often had channels made of earth or other porous materials but significant amounts of water are lost through such unlined aqueducts. As water gets increasingly scarce, these canals are being lined with concrete, polymers, or impermeable soil. In some cases, a new aqueduct is built alongside the old one because it cannot be shut down during construction.

Gallery

See also

Acequia
Zanja
Qanat
Earthquake engineering
Goldfields Water Supply Scheme
Leat
List of aqueducts
List of canal aqueducts in the United Kingdom
List of Roman aqueduct bridges
Navigable aqueduct
Pipeline – some used to carry water
Roman architecture
Roman engineering
Sanitation in Ancient Rome
Water resources

Notes

References

Sextus Julius Frontinus, De Aquaeductu Urbis Romae (On the water management of the city of Rome), Translated by R. H. Rodgers, 2003, University of Vermont
Chanson, H. (2002). Certains Aspects de la Conception hydrauliques des Aqueducs Romains. ('Some Aspect on the Hydraulic Design of Roman Aqueducts.') Journal La Houille Blanche, No. 6/7, pp. 43–57 (ISSN 0018-6368)
Chanson, H. (2008). "The Hydraulics of Roman Aqueducts: What do we know? Why should we learn?" in Proceedings of World Environmental and Water Resources Congress 2008 Ahupua'a, ASCE-EWRI Education, Research and History Symposium, Hawaii, USA, Invited Keynote lecture, 13–16 May, R.W. Badcock Jr and R. Walton Eds., 16 pages

Further reading
Aicher, Peter J. 1995. Guide to the aqueducts of ancient Rome. Wauconda, IL: Bolchazy-Carducci.
Beltrán Lloris, Francisco. 2006. "An irrigation decree from Roman Spain: The Lex Rivi Hiberiensis." Journal of Roman Studies 96: 147–97.
Bruun, Christer. 1991. The water supply of ancient Rome: A study of Roman imperial administration. Helsinki: Societas Scientiarum Fennica.
Coulton, J. J. 1987. "Roman aqueducts in Asia Minor." In Roman architecture in the Greek world. Edited by Sarah Macready and Frederick Hugh Thompson, 72–84. London: Society of Antiquaries.
Frankel, R. 2002. "The Hellenistic aqueduct of Akko-Ptolemais." Journal of Roman Archaeology (Supplementary Studies) 46: 82–87.
Grewe, Klaus. 2008. "Tunnels and canals." In The Oxford handbook of engineering and technology in the classical world. Edited by John Peter Oleson, 319–36. Oxford: Oxford Univ. Press.
Hodge, A. Trevor. 1992. Roman aqueducts and water supply. London: Duckworth.
Lewis, Michael Jonathan Taunton. 2001. Surveying instruments of Greece and Rome. Cambridge, UK, and New York: Cambridge Univ. Press.
Wilson, Andrew I. 1999. "Deliveries extra urbem: Aqueducts and the countryside." Journal of Roman Archaeology 12: 314–32.
--. 2008. "Hydraulic engineering and water supply." In The Oxford handbook of engineering and technology in the classical world. Edited by John Peter Oleson, 337–68. Oxford: Oxford Univ. Press.

External links

Waterhistory.org: Imperial Rome Water Systems
Romanaqueducts.info: 600 Roman aqueducts, with 25 descriptions in detail

 

Buildings and structures by type
Routes
Water supply
Ancient inventions